Bursera grandifolia is a Mexican species of trees in the frankincense family in the soapwood order. It is widespread across much of Mexico from Sonora to the Yucatán Peninsula, and found also in Central America as far south as Costa Rica.

Bursera grandifolia has leaves that are pinnately compound with 5 leaflets, each leaflet egg-shaped and 5–7 cm long, hairy on the underside but not on the topside. Drupes are egg-shaped with a few scattered hairs.

References

grandifolia
Flora of Mexico
Flora of Central America
Plants described in 1843